Hubert Skowronek (3 December 1941 – 6 January 1979) was a Polish footballer and manager.

With Górnik Zabrze he won 2 Polish Championships in 1971 and 1972, and played in the 1970 European Cup Winners' Cup Final. He also played in one match for the Poland national football team on 3 December 1966, in a scoreless friendly against Israel.

He went on to be manager for a host of Polish Second Division clubs.

Bibliography

References

External links
 

1941 births
1979 deaths
Polish footballers
Poland international footballers
Śląsk Wrocław players
Piast Gliwice players
Górnik Zabrze players
Piast Gliwice managers
Stal Stalowa Wola managers
Association football midfielders